Imparato is a surname. Notable people with the surname include:

Ciro Imparato (1962–2015), Italian psychologist, voice actor, actor, announcer, and writer
Girolamo Imparato (1550-1621), Italian painter
Francesco Imparato (1520-1570), Italian painter
Raffaele Imparato (born 1986), Italian footballer